The Marseille turn, also known as the 360, the Spin, the Mooresy Roulette, the Roulette, the Girosflin, and the double drag-back, is a specialised dribbling skill unique to the game of Association football. With so many different names, the exact origin of this skill move is unknown. The Marseille turn was first popularized in Europe by French striker Yves Mariot in the 1970s. Diego Maradona and Zinedine Zidane were arguably the most notable exponents of the move, and thus it has also been known as the Maradona turn and the Zidane turn.

Variations 
French footballer Zinedine Zidane was known to use different variations of the Marseille turn. Instead of using his sole to drag the ball back in the move's first phase, Zidane sometimes used the inside of the foot, especially when performing the move while running at high speed.

The possible merits of this variation can be derived from the difference between stud-less training shoes and football boots with studs.The studs of football boots provide less contact area with the ball when compared to a stud-less shoe, thereby increasing the possibility of the move being unsuccessful.

Franck Ribéry and Aiden McGeady have also performed slightly modified versions of the spin. The modifications include dragging the ball behind their standing foot instead of to the side during the first phase, while in the third phase the outside of the boot is used instead of the sole.

The Aiden McGeady variation, known as the McGeady spin, has been included in EA Sports' FIFA video game series.

Uses and effectiveness 
The maneuver is most effective when the opposing player approaches head on or from the side of the player's master foot.

The first drag back enables the player to retain control of the ball by removing the ball from the arc of the opposing player's tackle. The body spin positions the back of the dribbling player's body in between the opposing player and the ball to shield the ball.

The second drag-back changes the direction of the ball, and, when combined with the completion of the spin, allows for both player and ball to move in the same direction and hence gain momentum for a continued run or a shot.

When performed at speed, the maneuver is almost impossible to defend against as it incorporates a sudden change in direction with a continuous shielding of the ball. One tactic the defending player can call upon is to use his body to shove the dribbler off balance during the move. This may invite a foul called upon the defending player, depending on the referee's judgement. The reason players like Zidane and Maradona have been able to use it with a high success rate is due in no small part to their own considerable body mass, as well as their excellent balance.

The maneuver can also be used when the ball is going out of play away from the player. By using a lunging step for the first drag-back in the roulette, the player can prevent the ball from exiting the field of play and continue dribbling along the touchline in one fluid motion.

See also

Dummy/feint
Flip flap
Cruyff turn
Dribble

Notes and references

Association football skills
Association football terminology